Tomáš Mrva (born 6 April 1989) is a Slovak footballer who currently plays for TJ Baník Ružiná.

In 2006, he joined Danish Brøndby IF's promising youth academy, but did not get his first team debut before returning to Slovakia - when he was signed Brøndby talent boss Kim Vilfort said "Tomas is a really good ball player, and we don't have a natural left footed back in our system ... he's got a great potential and we can see him having the abilities af going all the way to the A-team in the long run..." 
He is from the same year and played together with a player such as  Brøndby-defender Daniel Wass, who is one of the most promising players in the Danish Superliga in 2010-2011. Mrva joined Czech side České Budějovice in 2009, but failed to make a first-team appearance in his time with the club.

References

External links
MFK Dubnica profile 

1989 births
Living people
Slovak footballers
Association football fullbacks
SK Dynamo České Budějovice players
FK Dubnica players
Slovak Super Liga players
TJ Baník Ružiná players
MFK Dolný Kubín players
Spartak Myjava players
People from Myjava
Sportspeople from the Trenčín Region